Paradise Glacier is a glacier on the southeast flank of Mount Rainier in Washington. The glacier is bounded to the west by the Muir Snowfield, Anvil Rock and McClure Rock. This smaller lobe melted between 2004 and 2006. Meltwater from the glacier drains into the Cowlitz River.

See also
List of glaciers

References

Glaciers of Mount Rainier
Glaciers of Washington (state)